Kapesovo is a village in the Zagori region (Epirus region), it is 43 km north of Ioannina. The name Kapesovo is Slavic and means garden. The village used to be more south near Baya (Kipi), where many vegetables were grown and it was called "Kapouska". It was later moved to its current position for health reasons. There is a big cliff next to the village called "Kapesios" (a Slavic word that means cliff) and the name of the village might be related to it.

The village is near the Vikos canyon, the view of which is spectacular at certain spots.

History 
In the 18th and 19th centuries Kapesovo was renowned in Epirus for its painters, called mpogades, that worked in dozens of churches from Moscopole to Arta.

Kapesovo experienced a great flourishing until 1860 and this is evident in the great manors with folk wall paintings and churches with paintings (hagiographies) in their interior. The church of Aghios Nikolaos, built in 1793, the cultural center and the folkloric museum are some of the village's attractions. In the Paschaleios School, found at 1861, by Konstantinos and Pavlos Paschalis, is kept today one of the four copies of Rigas Fereos chart.

The village also might have been settled by Orthodox Albanians, locally called "Arvanites", who largely came after the 15th century, later assimilating into the local population.

Out of the village is a cobble stone pathway down a steep rocky slope that leads to nearby Vradeto. The pathway is a work of great craftsmanship of Epirotic artisans. Outside of the village, close to Kipoi village is the famous bridge of Kalogeriko or Plakidas.

The Kapesovites used to migrate mostly to Egypt and the U.S. In Greece, they migrated to Macedonia and Athens.

Personalities
Konstantinos and Pavlos Paschalis, merchants and benefactors.
Alexis Noutsos, advisor of Ali Pasha.
Ioannoutsos Karamesinis, general governor of the 'League of Zagori', 19th century.

Gallery

Sources
 Prefecture of Ioannina. Tourist department of Greece

Bibliography

References

Populated places in Ioannina (regional unit)